The 2009 Indoor Cricket World Cup was the ninth edition of the tournament and took place between 11 and 17 October 2009 in Brisbane, Australia. The event is notable as the first international indoor cricket event to take place there since the merger of Indoor Cricket Australia and Cricket Australia.

Australian Cricket hall of fame member and former test cricketer Ian Healy served as ambassador for the event.

The 2009 Junior World Series of Indoor Cricket took place alongside this event.

Host Selection
The World Cup was awarded to Australia by the WICF at the conclusion of the previous World Cup. As a result, Australia became the second nation to host the World Cup twice, having hosted the 1998 Indoor Cricket World Cup at the Glass House in Melbourne.

As the national body for both traditional cricket and indoor cricket, Cricket Australia is the first unified national body to host an international indoor cricket event.

Venue
Cricket Australia determined that Brisbane West Indoor Sports Centre in Darra, Brisbane would host all World Cup matches and Brisbane became the host city as a result. Cricket Australia relocated the 2009 Australian Open Indoor Cricket Championships from Campbelltown to Brisbane to serve as a test event for the new venue.

Media coverage

Television
Cricket Australia has arranged for limited delayed telecast of the finals series on Fox Sports in Australia. This represents the first mainstream television coverage of an Indoor Cricket event (international or otherwise) in a decade. Fox Sports will broadcast highlights packages for the finals series and will broadcast the Men's final in full approximately two weeks after the conclusion of the tournament.

Online Coverage
Cricket Australia provided online coverage including news and results on the official World Cup Website. Action Sports South Africa provided full results details (including scoresheets and statistics) on their website.

A number of players, officials and spectators also provided coverage for friends and members of the public via social networking sites such as Facebook and Twitter.

Participants
Men's Division
  Australia
  England
  New Zealand
  South Africa
  Sri Lanka

India and Pakistan were also entered in the Men's division but were forced to withdraw just days before the commencement of the tournament due to issues entering Australia. The withdrawal was at such short notice that the tournament program still contains the team listings and player photographs for both sides, and includes the original draw featuring their matches.

Women's Division
  Australia
  England
  New Zealand
  South Africa
  Wales

Round Robin tournament

Day One

The entirety of day one was a "ticketed session" in that only ticket holders were allowed into the venue. The theme for the day was "Trans Tasman Day" and featured Australia vs New Zealand in the evening match.

Men's Division

Ladder at conclusion of Day One

Women's Division

Ladder at conclusion of Day One

Day Two

The evening session on was ticketed and in keeping with the theme of "Aussie Juniors Night" featured few matches from the open divisions and instead focused on the simultaneously run 2009 Junior World Series of Indoor Cricket. Most open matches therefore took place whilst free entry to the venue was permitted.

Men's Division

Ladder at conclusion of Day Two

Women's Division

Ladder at conclusion of Day Two

Day Three

Day three featured both free and ticketed matches. The theme of "Ashes Night" saw Australia take on England in the ticketed evening session, whilst the daytime games were held during free admission periods.

Men's Division

Ladder at conclusion of Day Three

Women's Division

Ladder at conclusion of Day Three

Day Four

Day four featured both free and ticketed matches. The theme of "Green and Gold Rivalry Night" saw Australia take on South Africa in the ticketed evening session, whilst the daytime games were during free admission periods.

Men's Division

Ladder at conclusion of Day Four

Women's Division

Ladder at conclusion of Day Four

Day Five

Day five featured both free and ticketed matches. The theme of "World Cup Men's Night" saw a full round of Men's matches played during the ticketed session, whilst the daytime Men's games and all Women's games were during free admission periods.

Men's Division

Ladder at conclusion of Day Five

Women's Division

Ladder at conclusion of Day Five

Finals

Semi finals
Day six of the tournament featured all of the semi finals from both divisions and followed a top four format. The first and second-placed sides contested the Major Semi Final with the winner progressing to the World Cup Final whilst the loser contested the Preliminary Final against the winner of the Minor Semi Final featuring the third and fourth-placed sides. All matches took place during ticketed sessions.

The semi finals saw both the Australian men and Australian women suffer their first losses of the tournament.

Men's Division

A: Major Semi Final (1v2)

B: Minor Semi Final (3v4)

Preliminary Final (Loser A v Winner B)

Women's Division

A: Major Semi Final (1v2)

B: Minor Semi Final (3v4)

Preliminary Final (Loser A v Winner B)

World Cup Final

The seventh and final day of the tournament featured the World Cup Finals. Both the Australian Men and Australian Women won their respective finals in close matches and kept Australia's flawless World Cup title record intact.

Men's Division

Women's Division

See also
 Indoor Cricket World Cup
 2009 Junior World Series of Indoor Cricket

Notes

Indoor Cricket World Cup
Indoor Cricket World Cup